The Jewish question, also referred to as the Jewish problem, was a wide-ranging debate in 19th- and 20th-century European society that pertained to the appropriate status and treatment of Jews. The debate, which was similar to other "national questions", dealt with the civil, legal, national, and political status of Jews as a minority within society, particularly in Europe during the 18th, 19th, and 20th centuries.

The debate began with Jewish emancipation in western and central European societies during the Age of Enlightenment and after the French Revolution.  The debate's issues included the legal and economic Jewish disabilities (such as Jewish quotas and segregation), Jewish assimilation, and Jewish Enlightenment.

The expression has been used by antisemitic movements from the 1880s onwards, culminating in the Nazi phrase of the "Final Solution to the Jewish Question". Similarly, the expression was used by proponents for and opponents of the establishment of an autonomous Jewish homeland or a sovereign Jewish state.

History of "the Jewish question"

The term "Jewish question" was first used in Great Britain around 1750 when the expression was used during the debates related to the Jewish Naturalisation Act 1753. According to Holocaust scholar Lucy Dawidowicz, the term "Jewish Question," as introduced in western Europe, was a neutral expression for the negative attitude toward the apparent and persistent singularity of the Jews as a people against the background of the rising political nationalism and new nation-states. Dawidowicz writes that "the histories of Jewish emancipation and of European antisemitism are replete with proffered 'solutions to the Jewish question.'"

The question was next discussed in France after the French Revolution in 1789. It was discussed in Germany in 1843 via Bruno Bauer's treatise  ("The Jewish Question"). He argued that Jews could achieve political emancipation only if they let go their religious consciousness, as he proposed that political emancipation required a secular state. In 1898, Theodor Herzl's treatise, advocates Zionism as a "modern solution for the Jewish question" by creating an independent Jewish state, preferably in Palestine.

According to Otto Dov Kulka of Hebrew University, the term became widespread in the 19th century when it was used in discussions about Jewish emancipation in Germany. In the 19th century hundreds of tractates, pamphlets, newspaper articles and books were written on the subject, with many offering such solutions as resettlement, deportation, or assimilation of the Jewish population. Similarly, hundreds of works were written opposing these solutions and offering instead solutions such as re-integration and education. This debate however, could not decide whether the problem of the Jewish question had more to do with the problems posed by the German Jews' opponents or vice versa: the problem posed by the existence of the German Jews to their opponents.

From around 1860, the term was used with an increasingly antisemitic tendency: Jews were described under this term as a stumbling block to the identity and cohesion of the German nation and as enemies within the Germans' own country. Antisemites such as Wilhelm Marr, Karl Eugen Dühring, Theodor Fritsch, Houston Stewart Chamberlain, Paul de Lagarde and others declared it a racial problem insoluble through integration. They stressed this in order to strengthen their demands to "de-jewify" the press, education, culture, state and economy. They also proposed to condemn inter-marriage between Jews and non-Jews. They used this term to oust the Jews from their supposedly socially dominant positions.

The topic was also taken up by Jews themselves, as depicted in the 1934 science fiction book “Zwei im andern Land”, by Martin Salomonski, which imagines a refuge for Jews on the moon.

The most infamous use of this expression was by the Nazis in the early- and mid-twentieth century. They implemented what they called their "Final Solution to the Jewish question" through the Holocaust during World War II, when they attempted to exterminate Jews in Europe.

Bruno Bauer – The Jewish Question
In his book The Jewish Question (1843), Bauer argued that Jews could only achieve political emancipation if they relinquish their particular religious consciousness. He believed that political emancipation requires a secular state, and such a state did not leave any "space" for social identities such as religion. According to Bauer, such religious demands were incompatible with the idea of the "Rights of Man." True political emancipation, for Bauer, required the abolition of religion.

Karl Marx – On the Jewish Question
Karl Marx replied to Bauer in his 1844 essay On the Jewish Question. Marx repudiated Bauer's view that the nature of the Jewish religion prevented assimilation by Jews. Instead, Marx attacked Bauer's very formulation of the question from "can the Jews become politically emancipated?" as fundamentally masking the nature of political emancipation itself.

Marx used Bauer's essay as an occasion for his own analysis of liberal rights. Marx argued that Bauer was mistaken in his assumption that in a "secular state", religion would no longer play a prominent role in social life. As an example, he referred to the pervasiveness of religion in the United States, which, unlike Prussia, had no state religion. In Marx's analysis, the "secular state" was not opposed to religion, but rather assumed it. The removal of religious or property qualifications for citizenship did not mean the abolition of religion or property, but rather naturalized both and introduced a way of regarding individuals in abstraction from them. On this note Marx moved beyond the question of religious freedom to his real concern with Bauer's analysis of "political emancipation." Marx concluded that while individuals can be 'politically' free in a secular state, they were still bound to material constraints on freedom by economic inequality, an assumption that would later form the basis of his critiques of capitalism.

After Marx

Werner Sombart praised Jews for their capitalism and presented the seventeenth–eighteenth century court Jews as integrated and a model for integration. By the turn of the twentieth century, the debate was still widely discussed. The Dreyfus Affair in France, believed to be evidence of anti-semitism, increased the prominence of this issue. Within the religious and political elite, some continued to favor assimilation and political engagement in Europe while others, such as Theodor Herzl, proposed the advancement of a separate Jewish state and the Zionist cause.

Josef Ringo proposed the establishment of a Jewish state in his 1917 The Jewish question in its historical context and proposals for its solution.

Between 1880 and 1920, millions of Jews created their own solution for the pogroms of eastern Europe by emigration to other places, primarily the United States and western Europe.

The Nazi "Final Solution"
In Nazi Germany, the term Jewish Question (in ) referred to the belief that the existence of Jews in Germany posed a problem for the state. In 1933 two Nazi theorists, Johann von Leers and Achim Gercke, both proposed the idea that the Jewish Question could be solved by resettling Jews in Madagascar, or somewhere else in Africa or South America. They also discussed the pros and cons of supporting the German Zionists. Von Leers asserted that establishing a Jewish homeland in Mandatory Palestine would create humanitarian and political problems for the region.

Upon achieving power in 1933, Adolf Hitler and the Nazi state began to implement increasingly severe legislation that was aimed at segregating and ultimately removing Jews from Germany and (eventually) all of Europe. The next stage was the persecution of the Jews and the stripping of their citizenship through the 1935 Nuremberg Laws. Starting with 1938 Kristallnacht pogrom and later, during World War II, it became state-sponsored internment in concentration camps. Finally the government implemented the systematic extermination of the Jewish people (The Holocaust), which took place as the so-called Final Solution to the Jewish Question.

Nazi propaganda was produced in order to manipulate the public, the most notable examples of which were based on the writings of people such as Eugen Fischer, Fritz Lenz and Erwin Baur in Foundations of Human Heredity Teaching and Racial Hygiene. The work  (Allowing the Destruction of Life Unworthy of Living) by Karl Binding and Alfred Hoche and the pseudo-scholarship that was promoted by Gerhard Kittel also played a role. In occupied France, the collaborationist regime established its own Institute for studying the Jewish Questions.

In the United States
A "Jewish problem" was euphemistically discussed in majority-European countries outside Europe, even as the Holocaust was in progress.  American military officer and celebrity Charles A. Lindbergh used the phrase repeatedly in public speeches and writing.  For example in his diary entry of September 18, 1941, published in 1970 as part of The Wartime Journals of Charles A. Lindbergh, he wrote

Contemporary use
A dominant anti-Semitic conspiracy theory is the belief that Jewish people have undue influence over the media, banking, and politics. Based on this conspiracy theory, certain groups and activists discuss the "Jewish Question" and offer different proposals to address it. In the early 21st century, white nationalists, alt-righters, and neo-Nazis have used the initialism JQ in order to refer to the Jewish question.

See also
 Antisemitic canard
 Armenian question
 David Nirenberg § Anti-Judaism: The Western Tradition
 German Question
 Irish question
 Martin Luther and antisemitism
 National question
 Negro Question
 Polish question
 The Race Question
 Ulrich Fleischhauer
 Useful Jew

Notes

References

Further reading
 Case, Holly. The Age of Questions (Princeton University Press, 2018)  excerpt
 Roudinesco, Elisabeth (2013) Returning to the Jewish Question, London, Polity Press, p. 280
 Wolf, Lucien (1919) "Notes on the Diplomatic History of the Jewish Question", Jewish Historical Society of England
 The Jewish cause: an introduction to a different Israeli history – the subject's impact during the Holocaust

External links
 Israeli Foreign Policy and the Jewish Question

National questions
Jewish political status
The Holocaust
Adolf Hitler
Karl Marx
Debates about social issues
Minority rights